Wolf Point is an incorporated ranchingtown in, and the county seat of, Roosevelt County, Montana, United States. The population was 2,517 at the 2020 census, down 4% from 2,621 in the 2010 Census. It is the largest community on the Fort Peck Indian Reservation. Wolf Point is the home of the annual Wild Horse Stampede, held every year during the second weekend of July. Wolf Point's Wild Horse Stampede is the oldest rodeo in Montana, and has been called the "Grandaddy of Montana Rodeos".

Wolf Point also is home of the Wadopana Pow-wow, the oldest traditional pow wow in Montana and always held the first week in August.

History
Wolf Point began as a trading post in the 1860s, at the confluence of Wolf Creek and the Missouri River. Farming began in the area as early as 1874. The Great Northern Railway arrived in 1887. Wolf Point incorporated in 1915 and became the county seat in 1919.

Geography

Topography
Wolf Point is located in north-eastern Montana in the wide, shallow valley of the Missouri River, just below its confluence with Wolf Creek. Wolf Point is situated on the High Plains of eastern Montana.

The city is located on the north bank of the Missouri River, the southern part occupying the ancestral floodplain of that river. The northern part occupies south facing, low-lying hills overlooking a terrace. The central business district is located in the described southern portion.

Climate
Wolf Point experiences a semi-arid steppe climate (BSkw), with generally cold, dry winters and hot summers. Late spring and early summer is on average the wettest period of the year. During the summer warm, humid air masses more typical of a warm summer continental climate (Dfb) may move into the area from the south or east. Summertime thunderstorms commonly occur and sometimes can be severe featuring hail and, infrequently, funnel clouds or tornados.

Cold waves may cover the area 6 to 12 times per winter, with temperatures well below . Between cold waves there are sometimes periods of longer than 10 days of mild, but often windy weather caused by chinook winds. These winds cause temperatures to rise rapidly, often giving relief in the form of mild temperatures in the coldest months of the year.

Demographics

2010 census
As of the census of 2010, there were 2,621 people, 952 households, and 635 families residing in the city. The racial makeup of the city was 42.5% White, 0.2% African American, 50.5% Native American, 1.2% Asian, and 5.5% from two or more races. Hispanic or Latino of any race were 1.6% of the population.

There were 952 households, of which 38.2% had children under the age of 18 living with them, 41.4% were married couples living together, 18.5% had a female householder with no husband present, 6.8% had a male householder with no wife present, and 33.3% were non-families. 27.8% of all households were made up of individuals, and 11.7% had someone living alone who was 65 years of age or older. The average household size was 2.65 and the average family size was 3.25.

The median age in the city was 33.7 years. 29.1% of residents were under the age of 18; 9.3% were between the ages of 18 and 24; 22.7% were from 25 to 44; 26.2% were from 45 to 64; and 12.5% were 65 years of age or older. The gender makeup of the city was 46.9% male and 53.1% female.

2000 census
As of the census of 2000, there were 2,663 people, 981 households, and 685 families residing in the city. The population density was 3,024.8 people per square mile (1,168.4/km). There were 1,091 housing units at an average density of 1,239.2 per square mile (478.7/km). The racial makeup of the city was 55.73% White, 0.04% African American, 40.52% Native American, 1.01% Asian, 0.34% from other races, and 2.37% from two or more races. Hispanic or Latino of any race were 1.61% of the population.

There were 981 households, out of which 37.2% had children under the age of 18 living with them, 49.5% were married couples living together, 15.3% had a female householder with no husband present, and 30.1% were non-families. 26.3% of all households were made up of individuals, and 12.6% had someone living alone who was 65 years of age or older. The average household size was 2.63 and the average family size was 3.14.

In the city, the age distribution of the population shows 31.0% under the age of 18, 7.8% from 18 to 24, 25.5% from 25 to 44, 20.0% from 45 to 64, and 15.7% who were 65 years of age or older. The median age was 36 years. For every 100 females, there were 90.8 males. For every 100 females age 18 and over, there were 83.5 males.

The median income for a household in the city was $27,962, and the median income for a family was $33,681. Males had a median income of $26,325 versus $23,333 for females. The per capita income for the city was $13,605. About 17.0% of families and 17.9% of the population were below the poverty line, including 23.1% of those under age 18 and 5.7% of those age 65 or over.

Government
The city of Wolf Point has a mayor-council form of government with a city council consisting of eight elected council members—two members from each of four wards. The mayor is elected at-large for a four-year term. The city council determines the policy direction and administers the daily affairs of city government. The mayor appoints, with advice and consent of the council, the city attorney, the hybrid position of city clerk-treasurer, and the police chief. The position of city judge is shared with the Justice of the Peace of Roosevelt County.

Mayors
Mathew Golik (November 4, 1948 – March 1, 2008) was the mayor between 1999 and 2008. He was appointed mayor in 1999 when the mayor at the time resigned. Golik was elected mayor in his own right in 2001 and re-elected in 2005; he held the post until his death. On March 1 his three-wheeler went through the ice on Fort Peck Lake where he had been ice fishing and he drowned. DeWayne W. Jager assumed the duties of the mayor's office following Golik's death as the then city council president and was appointed to the post on March 17, 2008. Mayor Jager was elected to the position in the November 2009 general election.

Education

K-12
The Wolf Point Public Schools, District No. 45/45A operates an elementary, a middle, and a junior/senior high school with a total student enrollment of more than 860 students. Nearby, Frontier Elementary School, District No. 3, serves some rural areas of Roosevelt County and northern McCone County in grades pre-kindergarten through eighth grade, and had an enrollment of more than 100 in the 2010–2011 school year. Wolf Point High School is a Class B school (108-306 students) which helps determine athletic competitions. They are known as the Wolves.

Although Native Americans "make up more than half of the student body", they are "less than one-fifth of the staff," and have a lower graduation rate. In June 2017, a civil rights complaint was filed with the U.S. Department of Education’s Office for Civil Rights by the Fort Peck Tribal Executive Board.

College
Fort Peck Community College expanded to Wolf Point. The new brick facility is located one block south of the center of Main Street. FPCC is a tribal community college that offers affordable Applied Science Programs, Associate Degree Programs, Transfer Programs, and GEDs. In 2009, FPCC initiated men's and women's collegiate basketball teams.

Library
Roosevelt County Library is headquartered in Wolf Point with branch locations in Culbertson and Froid.

Culture

Media
Wolf Point is served by two weekly newspapers, the Wolf Point Herald-News, and the Poplar, Montana, based Fort Peck Journal. A third paper funded by Fort Peck tribal government, the Wotanin Wowapi, ceased publication on January 28, 2008.

The city's radio stations are KVCK (AM) 1450 and KVCK-FM 92.7.

Wolf Point and Roosevelt County are part of the Minot-Bismarck-Dickinson local television media market (DMA). Broadcast television can be received, either directly or via translator, from KWSE 4 (PBS), KUMV 8 (NBC), and KXMD 11 (CBS) all based in Williston, North Dakota; and KFBB 5 (ABC/FOX) based in Great Falls, Montana.

Attractions and recreation

The Wolf Point Area Museum provides a glimpse into local history. Open seasonally from May to September, the museum is located in a renovated farm implement sales building on U.S. Highway 2 which allows for extensive display of the museum's collections. The Wolf Point Area Historical Society purchased the Hansen Implement building in July, 2007, and after a fund raising campaign opened in the new location in June, 2010.

The historic Lewis and Clark Bridge (Wolf Point Bridge) crosses the Missouri River six miles southeast of the city on Montana Highway 13. The adjacent  Lewis and Clark Fishing Access Site also known as Bridge Park provides access to fishing, boating, rafting, wildlife viewing, and picnicking on the Missouri River. The boat access ramp, damaged during the 2011 Missouri River floods, was replaced during the summer of 2012.

Notable people
 Marvin Brookman, rodeo stock contractor and cowboy, inducted into the ProRodeo Hall of Fame in 2005.
 Casey FitzSimmons, National Football League tight end with the Detroit Lions.
 John Lowenstein, former Major League Baseball player for the Cleveland Indians, Texas Rangers and the Baltimore Orioles.
 Kameron (Kam) Mickolio, former Major League relief pitcher for the Arizona Diamondbacks, currently with Hiroshima Toyo Carp.
 Montie Montana, rodeo trick rider, actor, stuntman and cowboy inducted into the ProRodeo Hall of Fame in 1994. 
 Ted Schwinden, former Democratic Governor of Montana (1981–1989), named one of the "100 Most Influential Montanans of the Century".
 Hank Adams (1943-2020),  Native American rights activist.

References in literature
 William Least Heat-Moon wrote about the night he spent here in his autobiographical book Blue Highways: A Journey Into America.
 In the fictional Marvel Comics Universe the superhero Red Wolf (William Talltrees) was born in a Wolf Point located on a Cheyenne Reservation.

Infrastructure

Transportation

Air
Scheduled air service at Wolf Point's L. M. Clayton Airport is provided by Cape Air, the designated United States Department of Transportation (USDOT) Essential Air Service (EAS) operator, with direct daily flights to Billings and Glasgow, Montana. The Essential Air Service contract had formerly been held by now-defunct Big Sky Airlines and Great Lakes Airlines.

Highways
U.S. Route 2, a major east-west route in the northern tier of states, connects Wolf Point with other Hi-Line communities from Washington state to the Upper Peninsula of Michigan. Montana Highway 25 provides a connection to Montana Highway 13, six miles east of the city. Montana Highway 13 extends from the Port of Scobey on the Canada–United States border in the north to Circle, Montana in the south.

Rail

Wolf Point is located on the Hi-Line of the BNSF Railway and has developed as a major shipment point for grain to West Coast and Great Lakes ports. Wolf Point is served daily westbound and eastbound by Amtrak's Empire Builder, and is the first station stop west of Williston, North Dakota.

Medical facilities
Trinity Hospital offers inpatient care, and emergency care in addition to a wide range of other services, and is operated by Northeast Montana Health Services (NEMHS). NEMHS also operates the Faith Lutheran Home, a 60-bed skilled nursing facility; and the Listerud Rural Health Clinic in Wolf Point. The Chief Redstone Clinic is a facility operated by the Indian Health Service, an agency of the U.S. Department of Health and Human Services. It supports a wide range of health needs for the Native American population in the Wolf Point area on an outpatient basis.

See also
 List of state highways in Montana

References

Further reading

External links

 
 Wolf Point Chamber of Commerce
 Wolf Point Public Schools website
 Wolf Point Herald-News website
 Wolf Point Historical Photos

Cities in Roosevelt County, Montana
County seats in Montana
Montana populated places on the Missouri River
Populated places established in 1915
1915 establishments in Montana
Cities in Montana
Fort Peck Assiniboine and Sioux Tribes